The 1921 Birthday Honours were appointments by King George V to various orders and honours to reward and highlight good works by citizens of the British Empire. The appointments were made to celebrate the official birthday of the King, and were published on 3 and 4 June 1921.

The recipients of honours are displayed here as they were styled before their new honour, and arranged by honour, with classes (Knight, Knight Grand Cross, etc.) and then divisions (Military, Civil, etc.) as appropriate.

United Kingdom and British Empire

Marquess
The Rt. Hon. Sir George Nathaniel, Earl Curzon of Kedleston

Viscount
The Rt. Hon. Sir Frederick Edwin, Baron Birkenhead

Baron
The Rt. Hon. Sir James Henry Dalziel  by the name, style and title of Baron Dalziel of Kirkcaldy, of Marylebone in the county of London.
The Rt. Hon. Sir Ailwyn Edward Fellowes  by the name, style and title of Baron Ailwyn, of Honingham, in the County of Norfolk. Member of Parliament for Hants (Ramsey), 1887-1908; Junior Lord of the Treasury, 1900-1905. Chairman of Norfolk County Council. Chairman of Agricultural Wages Board; 
Sir Marcus Samuel by the name, style and title of Baron Bearsted, of Maidstone, in the County of Kent. For eminent public and national services. A generous benefactor to charitable and scientific objects.

Privy Councillor
The King appointed the following to His Majesty's Most Honourable Privy Council of the United Kingdom:
Sir Edwin Andrew Cornwall  Member of Parliament for N.E. Bethnal Green since 1906. Chairman of National Insurance Joint Commission, and Insurance Minister in the House of Commons, December, 1916, to February, 1919

The King appointed the following to His Majesty's Most Honourable Privy Council of Ireland:
The Hon. William Moore  One of the Judges of the King's Bench. Division of the High Court of Justice in Ireland
Sir Geoffrey Henry Browne, Baron Oranmore and Brownie  Member of Irish Convention
George Francis Stewart  Represented Southern Unionists on the Irish Convention, where he took a leading part in the effort to effect a settlement. He was Chairman of the Surveyors Institute in Great Britain, and also of the Land Agents Association. Has been Governor of the Bank of Ireland for two years, Deputy Lieutenant for the County of Dublin

Baronetcies

Douglas Alexander, President of the Singer Manufacturing Company. Has performed important work in the development of welfare schemes for industrial workers. For public and national services.
The Hon. William Gervase Beckett  Member of Parliament for Whitby since 1906
William Swart Berry, Editor-in-Chief, Sunday Times
Charles Alexander Cain  For public services. Has devoted large sums of money to hospital work in addition to other charities. Trustee and Governor of Blue Coat Hospital, Liverpool; the Royal Southern Hospital, Liverpool; and Chairman of Samaritan Hospital.
Thomas Sivewright Catto, for public services, particularly in connection with the transport of food and munitions from the United States to Great Britain and allied countries.
Sir William Dingwall Mitchell Cotts   in recognition of services rendered, to the Union of South Africa
John Bryn Edwards, for social and philanthropic work in East Glamorgan
Capt. Sir John Malcolm Fraser  For public services. Rendered valuable assistance in the Queen's Devonshire House Fund and in the Royal Naval Air Service during the war.
Joseph William Isherwood, Inventor of Isherwood System of Longitudinal Construction of Ships. Member of Institute of Naval Architects. For public services. 
Pierce Lacy, Founder and Chairman of Advisory Committee of British Shareholders Trust, Limited, which Company has financed many of the most important Industrial Companies in England.
William Arthur Mount  Member of Parliament for Newbury Division of Berkshire, 1900 to 1906, and since 1910
Sir Percy Wilson Newson, President of Bank of Bengal, 1920. Governor of Imperial Bank of India, 1921. For public services.
William Joseph Noble  President of Chamber of Shipping, 1920, and of the Baltic and White Sea Conference, 1913-21. For services rendered to the Ministry of Shipping.
George Renwick  Member of Parliament for Newcastle upon Tyne, 1900-1906, 1908–10, and since 1918.
Sir Arthur Munro Sutherland  Chairman of the Sutherland and a number of other Steamship Companies. Director of the Blyth Shipbuilding Company, and Mercantile Dry Docks. Sheriff of Newcastle, 1917; Lord Mayor of Newcastle during 1919. For public and national services.
Sir Charles Sykes  Member of Parliament for Huddersfield since 1918; director of Wool Textile Production and Chairman of the Board of Control of the Worsted Woollen Trades.
Edmund Hoyle Vestey, for public services. Rendered great assistance in feeding the troops during the war.

Knight Bachelor

Wilfred Atlay, Chairman, Stock Exchange, London
Jeffrey Browning  Chief-Inspector Board of Customs and Excise
William Henry Butlin, Ex Vice-Consul for Spain. For public services.
James Charles Calder  Ex-director of timber control. For public and national services.
Robert Clough  Member of Parliament for Keighley Division of Yorkshire. Mayor of Keighley 1907-1908
Thomas Henry Fleming, Mayor of Harrogate 1915-16, 1916–17, 1918-19. Rendered conspicuous services during the war in the-promotion of every local effort, giving his whole time to national work
Thomas Mansel Franklen, Clerk of the Peace for Glamorgan for 40 years. Clerk to the Glamorgan County Council since its formation in 1888. For public services.
Francis Gore-Browne  Chairman of Rates Advisory Committee. Chairman Civil Service Arbitration Board, 1918–20
His Honour Judge Thomas Colpitts Granger  Senior County Court Judge
John Roger Burrow Gregory, Senior partner in the firm of Rawle, Johnstone & Co., Treasurer of the Foundling Hospital. Past Master of the Grocers Company; Member of the Council of The Law Society. Has given very great assistance to successive holders of the office of Lord Chancellor
Colonel James William Greig  Member of Parliament for West Renfrewshire since January, 1910
Alderman Lieutenant-Colonel Harry George Handover  Mayor of Paddington for eight years
John Henry Harrowing, for public services. Twenty-eight years County Councillor of the North Riding County Council and afterwards elected County Alderman.
William Henderson  Town Councillor Dundee, 1896-1904. Chairman of Technical College. Chairman of YMCA and of City of Dundee Territorial Association. 1907-1919. For public and local services.
Francis Hugh George Hercy  For valuable voluntary services rendered for five years to the Ministry of National Service and War Office.
John Scott Hindley, Commercial Adviser to the Coal Mines Dept. since 1918
Henry Hollingdrake  for public and local services.
Charles John Holmes  Director National Gallery
Councillor Sidney Richard White Humphries, for public services. Councillor of Bristol for many years. President of Bristol Chamber of Commerce
Samuel Instone, Founder of Askern Garden City. For public services.
Arthur Keith  Hunterian Professor and Conservator of the Royal College of Surgeons
Duncan Mackenzie Kerly  Member of the Commission on Income Tax and Chairman of the Board of Referees for Excess Profits Duty
Leonard William Kershaw, King's Coroner, Master of the Crown Office and Registrar of the Court of Criminal Appeal
William Lane-Mitchell  for Streatham since 1918. Twice Mayor of Camberwell
Alfred Edward Lewis, Managing Director of the National Provincial and Union Bank of England, Ltd
Thomas Lewis  Honorary consulting physician to the Ministry of Pensions since April, 1919
Dyson Mallinson. For public services. Has rendered valuable services in connection with various colleges and institutions
Brigadier-General Charles Philip Martel   Chief Superintendent of Ordnance Factories, Woolwich
Richard Martin  Ex-Mayor of Swansea
George Mellor  For public and national services, particularly in connection with the King's Lancashire Military Convalescent Hospital
Adrian Donald Wilde Pollock, City Chamberlain and Treasurer since 1912
Walter Renton Preston, Member of Parliament for Stepney (Mile End Division)
William Henry Purchase, For valuable services rendered since the armistice to the Appointments Department of the Ministry of Labour
Professor John Rankine  Professor of Scots Law, University of Edinburgh
Francis Jubal Reynolds  For public services.
Edward Rhodes, Chairman of Lancashire and Cheshire Coalition Liberal Committee
Fredierick Gill Rice Past President of London Master Builders Association and of the Institute of Public Builders. For public services.
Colonel Philip Wigham Richardson . For services rendered throughout the Empire for 40 years in connection with rifle shooting
Alderman, Alfred Read Sargeant  Mayor of Hove throughout the war
Henry White Smith  Chairman of Bristol Aircraft Factory. For services to Civil Aviation
William Henry Thomas  Member of City of London Corporation. Deputy of the Ward of Cheap.
John Turner  Ex High Sheriff of Leicestershire. For public services.
Francis Minchin Voules  Knight of Grace of the Order of St. John of Jerusalem. For services rendered to British Prisoners of War.
Robert Woolley Walden, For public services. Member of the Metropolitan Asylums Board for 20 years and its Chairman for the past six years; 21 years Guardian of the Poor; 20 years a Member of the Council and Alderman of the City of Westminster, and Mayor, 1908-1909
Sydney Russell-Wells  Vice Chancellor, University of London. Representative of the University of London on the General Medical Council. For public services.
Howell James Williams  Deputy Chairman, London County Council
Robert Wilson, Provost of Pollokshaws
Alfred Woodgarbe  Proprietor-General of Establishments in the Ministry of Health since its formation
Bernard Swanwick Wright, Alderman of City of Nottingham. For public services.

Ireland
George Beresford Butler, Senior Resident Magistrate in Ireland. Was appointed in 1889, and is still serving
Frederick Conway Dwyer  Ex-President, College of Surgeons in Ireland. Lieutenant-Col (temporary), Royal Army Medical Corps, and Operating Surgeon to King George V. Military Hospital in Dublin. Honorary Surgeon to Lord Lieutenant of Ireland. Chairman of House of Industry Hospitals. H.M. Inspector of Anatomy in Ireland.
James Campbell Percy  Honorary Lieutenant, Royal Navy, during war. Proprietor of Motor News, Irish Builder, Irish Cyclist and Motor Cyclist. Chairman of Sackville Pines
Henry James Forde  For services in connection with the Grain Trade in Ireland and as member of Royal Commission on Wheat Supplies

British India
Justice Theagaraja Ayyar Sadasiva Ayyar, Diwam Bahadur, Puisne Judge of the High Court, Madras
Justice William Teunon, Indian Civil Service, Puisne Judge of the High Court, Calcutta, Bengal
Justice William Tudball, Indian Civil Service, Puisne Judge of the High Court, Allahabad, United Provinces
Khan Bahadur Muhammad Israr Hasan Khan  Judicial Minister, Bhopal State, Central India
Alfred Domald Pickford, Senior Partner, Messrs. Begg, Dunlop & Co., Calcutta, Bengal
Edgar Joseph Holberton  Manager, Bombay-Burma Trading Corporation, and lately President of the Chamber of Commerce, Burma
Jehangir Hormasji Kothari  Landlord, Sind, Bombay
Raj Bahadur Seth Bishesihar Das, Banker, Nagpur, Central Provinces

Colonies, Protectorates, etc.
Lieutenant-Colonel Wyndham Henry Deedes  Civil Secretary to the Administration, Palestine
Hugh Dixson, in recognition of services rendered to the Commonwealth of I Australia
Benjamin John Fuller, of Sydney, New South Wales, in recognition of services rendered to educational and charitable causes
John Burchmore Harrison  Director and Government Analyst, Department of Science and Agriculture, Colony of British Guiana
Sidney Kidman, in recognition of services rendered to the Commonwealth of Australia
John Pearce Luke  member of the House of Representatives of the Dominion of New Zealand, Mayor of the City of Wellington, for the past eight years
Brigadier-General Donald Johnstone McGavin  Director-General of Medical Services in New Zealand
Ponnambalam Ramanathan  nominated unofficial member of the Legislative Council of the Island of Ceylon
Lewis Richardson  in recognition of services rendered to the Union of South Africa
Walter Sydney Shaw, the Chief Justice of the Straits Settlements

The Most Honourable Order of the Bath

Knight Grand Cross of the Order of the Bath (GCB)

Military Division

Army
General Sir James Willcocks  Colonel of the Loyal Regiment (North Lancashire)
General Sir Herbert Vaughan Cox  Retired Pay, Indian Army

Knight Commander of the Order of the Bath (KCB)

Military Division
Royal Navy
Admiral Sir Frederick Charles Tudor-Tudor 
Major-General Charles Newsham Trotman 

Army
Lieutenant-General The Hon. Sir Frederick William Stopford 
Lieutenant-General Sir Alfred Edward Codrington  (Colonel, Coldstream Guards), 
Major General William Douglas Smith  
Major-General Christopher Rice Havard Nicholl (Colonel Commandant, Rifle Brigade), 
Major-General Philip Mainwaring Carnegy  Retired Pay, Indian Army

Civil Division
Surgeon Rear-Admiral Percy William Biassett-Smith 
Colonel Thomas Walter, Viscount Hampden 
Colonel Edward Nathan Whitley 
Francis Lewis Castle Floud  Permanent Secretary to the Ministry of Agriculture

Companion of the Order of the Bath (CB)

Military Division
Royal Navy
Rear-Admiral Philip Howard Colomb

Army
Major-General The Hon. Sir Charles John Sackville-West  Military Attaché
Colonel Guy William Fitton  Chief Paymaster, Royal Army Pay Corps
Colonel Francis Lyon  Military Attaché
Colonel Gilbert Harwood Harrison  Chief Engineer, Eastern Command
Colonel Julius Ralph Young, Chief Engineer, Forces in China
Colonel William Dunlop Smith  Deputy Director of Veterinary Services, Eastern Command
Colonel Charles Edward Pollock  Assistant Director of Medical Services, Eastern Command
Colonel William Maunder Withycombe  Brigade Commander, 3rd West Riding Infantry Brigade
Colonel Cosmo Gordon Stewart  Commander, Allahabad Brigade Area
Colonel Cyril Norman Macmullen  Indian Army, Brigade Commander, 17th Indian Infantry Brigade
Colonel John Francis Stanhope Duke-Coleridge  Indian Army, General Staff Officer, 1st Grade, Headquarters, Indian Army

Civil Division
Colonel Henry Clayton Darlington 
William Charles Fletcher, Chief Inspector of Secondary Education under the Board of Education
Llewelyn Southworth Lloyd, Assistant Secretary to the Department of Scientific and Industrial Research since its formation
Lieutenant-Colonel Ronald Dockray Waterhouse  Private Secretary to Bonar Law

The Most Exalted Order of the Star of India

Knight Grand Commander (GCSI)
Colonel His Highness Alhijah Farzand-i-Dilpazir-i-Daulat-i-Inglisihia, Mukhlis-ud-Daula Nasir-ul-Mulk Amir-ul-Umra Nawab Sir Hamid Ali Khan Bahadur, Mustaid Jung  Nawab of Rampur, Honorary Aide-de-Camp to His Majesty the King-Emperor

Knight Commander (KCSI)
Charles George Todhunter  Indian Civil Service, Member of the Executive Council, Madras
Sir Henry Wheeler  Indian Civil Service, Member of the Executive Council, Bengal

Companion (CSI)
Raja Sir Muhammad Ali Muhammad Khan, Khan Bahadur  Raja of Mahmudabad, Home Member, United Provinces Government
Robert Erskine Holland  Political Department, Government of India, Agent to the Governor General in Rajputana and Chief Commissioner of Ajmer-Merwara
Lieutenant-Colonel Francis Granville Seville  Political Department, Government of India, Agent to the Governor-General in Central India
Charles Alexander Innes  Indian Civil Service, Secretary to the Government of India, Commerce Department
Charles Joseph Hallifax  Indian Civil Service, Financial Commissioner, Punjab
Colonel Herbert Fothergill Cooke  Indian Army, Deputy Adjutant-General, Adjutant-General's Branch, Army Headquarters
Ernest Marinus Process, Chief Engineer and Secretary to Government, Public Works Department, Bombay
Leonard Tatham Harris, Indian Civil Service, Agency Commissioner, Madras
Albion Rajkumar Banerji  Indian Civil Service, First Member of the Executive Council of His Highness1 the Maharaja of Mysore
Reginald Isidore Robert Glancy  Indian Civil Service, Political Department of the Government of India
Sadar-ul-Maham, Finance Department, His Exalted Highness the Nizam's Government
William Robert Gourlay  Indian Civil Service, Private Secretary to His Excellency the Governor of Bengal
Colonel Kenneth Wigram  Indian Army, Commandant, 2nd Battalion, 2nd King Edward's Own Gurkha Rifles (The Sirmoor Rifles), late Director of Staff Duties, General Staff Branch, Army Headquarters
Raj Bahadur Major-General Dewan Bishan Das  Revenue Minister, Jammu and Kashmir State, Sirinagar

The Most Distinguished Order of Saint Michael and Saint George

Knight Grand Cross of the Order of St Michael and St George (GCMG)
Sir Hugh Charles Clifford  Governor and Commander-in-Chief of the Colony and Protectorate of Nigeria

Knight Commander of the Order of St Michael and St George (KCMG)

The Hon. Richard Anderson Squires  Prime Minister of Newfoundland
The Hon. James Mitchell  Premier, Minister for Lands and Colonial Treasurer of the State of Western Australia
The Hon. Edwin Mitchelson, Member of the Legislative Council of the Dominion of New Zealand
Sir Charles Stewart Addis  Manager of the Hong Kong and Shanghai Banking Corporation, for valuable services to His Majesty's Government in connection with finance in China

Honorary Knight Commander
His Highness Abdullah ibni Almerhum, Sultan Ahmad Ma'azaam Shah, Sultan of Pahang

Companion of the Order of St Michael and St George (CMG)
Sidney Browning, lately Provincial Commissioner, Uganda Protectorate
Clifford Henderson Hay  Secretary to the Premier's Department, State of New South Wales, and General Secretary to the Conference of Premiers of the Australian States
Benjamin Horsburgh, Controller of Revenue, Island of Ceylon
Lieutenant-Colonel William James Parke Hume, British Resident, Perak, Federated Malay States
John Maxwell, Deputy Chief Commissioner, Administrative and Political Department, Gold Coast
Frederick William Platts, Stipendiary Magistrate, Dominion of New Zealand
The Hon. Arthur Robinson, Attorney-General and Member of the Legislative Council of the State of Victoria
Major James Lewis Sleeman   recognition of services as Director of Military Training, New Zealand Military Forces
Rowland Arthur Charles Sperling, a Counsellor in the Foreign Office
Sir Percy Lyham Loraine  Counsellor in His Majesty's Diplomatic Service
Herbert Ashley Cunard Cummins   charge of His Majesty's Legation in Mexico since 1917
Harold George Parlett, Japanese Secretary to His Majesty's Embassy at Tokyo

Honorary Companions
Mohammadu, Sultan of Sokoto, Nigeria

The Most Eminent Order of the Indian Empire

Knight Commander (KCIE)
William Didsbury Sheppard  late Indian Civil Service, Member of the Council of India
Ludovic Charles Barter  Indian Civil Service, Finance Member, United Provinces Government
Lieutenant-Colonel Armine Brereton Dew  Political Department, Government of India, Agent to the Governor-General and Chief Commissioner in Baluchistan
Kawab Khan-i-Zaman Khan, Chief of Annib, North-West Frontier Province
Nawab Haji Fateh Ali Khan, Kazilbash  Lahore, Punjab
Raja Muhammad Nazim Khan  Tham or Ruler of Hunza Gilgit Agency, Kashmir
Major-General William Rice Edward  Indian Medical Service, Director-General, Indian Medical Service
Evan Maconochie  Indian Civil Service, Agent to the Governor in Kathiawar, Bombay
Sardar Mysore Kantaraj Urs  Mysore Civil Service, Dewan of Mysore
Colonel William Henry Willcox  late Medical Adviser to the Civil Administration in Mesopotamia

Companion (CIE)
John Edwin Clapham Jukes, Indian Civil Service, Joint Secretary, Finance Department, Government of India  
Ernest Burdon, Indian Civil Service, Financial Adviser, Military Finance
Nawab Muhammad Ahmad Said Khan  of Chitari, Bulandshah District, United Provinces
Herbert Edward West Martindell, Chief Engineer and Secretary, Public Works Department, Burma
Alexander Montgemerie, Indian Civil Service, Secretary, Political Department, Bombay
Evelyn Robins Abbott, Indian Civil Service, Commissioner, Multan Division, Punjab
James Cowlishaw Smith, Indian Civil Service, Magistrate and Collector, United Provinces
Percy Beart Thomas, Inspector-General of Police, Madras
John Richard Cunningham, Director of Public Instruction, Assam
Stephen Cox  Chief Conservator of Forests, Madras
Leslie Maurice Crump, Indian Civil Service, Political Department, Government of India, lately Political Agent, Phulkian States, Punjab
Hugh Kynaston Briscoe, Indian Civil Service, Collector of Cuttack, Bihar and Orissa
Temp. Lieutenant-Colonel Henry Rivers Nevill  Indian Civil Service, Indian Army Reserve of Officers, Assistant Adjutant-General, Army Headquarters
Lieutenant-Colonel Benjamin Hobbs Deare, Indian Medical Service, Principal, Medical College, Calcutta, Bengal
Henry Vernon Barstow Hare Scott, Indian Police, Deputy Director, Central Intelligence
Robert William Church, Mining Engineer to the Railway Board
Major Lewis Macclesfield Heath  Commandant, Seistan Levy Corps
Major Lionel Edward Lang  late Commandant, Seistan Levy Corps
Raj Bahadur Milkhi Ram, Senior Vice-President of the Municipal Committee, Lahore, Punjab
Rao Bahadur Kesho Govind Damle, Pleader, Vice-Chairman of the District Board, Akola, Central Provinces
James Walls Mackison, Executive Engineer, Bombay Municipality, Bombay
Arthur Lambert Playfair, of Dibrugarh, Assam
Raj Bahadur Babu Abinash Chandra Stem, Member of Council, Jaipur State, Rajputana
Maganlal Thakordas Balmukanda Modi, Merchant, Bombay
Doctor Mohendra Nath Banerjee, Medical Practitioner, Principal, Carmichael Medical College, Belgatchia, Bengal

Members of the Order of the Companions of Honour (CH) 

Harold Arthur, Viscount Dillon, Chairman of Trustees, National Portrait Gallery, since 1894
The Reverend Arthur Cayley Headlam  Regius Professor of Divinity, Oxford University, and Canon of Christchurch, Oxford, since 1918
Sir William Robertson Nicoll  Editor of the British Weekly since 1886

The Royal Victorian Order

Knight Grand Cross of the Royal Victorian Order (GCVO)

Colonel Sir Arthur Davidson

Knight Commander of the Royal Victorian Order (KCVO)
Sir Walter Parratt  (dated 10 February 1921)
Ernest de la Rue (dated 7 May 1921)
Robert Alfred McCall

Commander of the Royal Victorian Order (CVO)
Sir Ernest Hodder-Williams
Lieutenant-Colonel Ralph Verney 
Ralph Endersby Harwood 
Thomas William Smith 
Percy John de Paravicini

Member of the Royal Victorian Order, 4th class (MVO)
Major the Honorable Arthur Hay
The Reverend Walter Philip Besley
John Hilton Carter (dated 7 May 1921)
Lieutenant-Colonel Rupert Stewart 
Alfred Robert Brickwood Vaux
Horace West
The Reverend Herbert Francis Westlake

Member of the Royal Victorian Order, 5th class (MVO)
Thomas Henry Norton

Kaisar-i-Hind Medal

First Class
The Reverend Canon Arthur Whitcliffe Davies, Principal, St. John's College, Agra, United Provinces
George Rusby Kaye, Curator, Bureau of Education, Government of India
The Reverend William Meston, Professor and Bursar, Madras Christian College, Madras
M. R. Ry. Diwan Bahadur Duruseti Seshagiri Rao Pantulu Garu, President, Godavari District Board, Madras
The Reverend Ernest Muir, Missionary and Doctor, Bengal
Sri Gadahar Ramanuj Das, Mahant of Emar Math, Puri, Bihar and Orissa
Lee Ah Yain, an elected member of the Rangoon Municipal Committee, Burma

Air Force Cross (AFC)
Flight Lieutenant Eric Blake Grenfell

Air Force Medal (AFM)

Awarded a Bar to the Air Force Medal (AFM*) 
Sgt. Major II Walter Robert Mayes 
Flight Sgt. Sidney James Heath

Imperial Service Order (ISO)
Home Civil Service
George Theodore Knecht, Head of Establishments, Rules and Accounts Branch, Friendly Societies Registry
Griffith John Williams, Senior Inspector of Mines, Mines Department
Annie Alice Heap, Superintendent, Exchange Staff, London Telephone Service, General Post Office
William Harvey, Chief Clerk in Department of Prison Commission for Scotland
Francis Stephen Sheridan  Chief Clerk, Congested Districts Board (Ireland)

Colonial Civil Service
Capt. Hubert Berkeley, District Officer, Upper Perak, Federated Malay States
Edward Albert Counsel, Surveyor-General and Secretary for Lands, State of Tasmania
John Smith Erbynn, Chief Clerk, Ashanti Political Service
George Gozzard Martin, Secretary to the Attorney-General, State of South Australia
Alfred Ernest Clarence Ross, Postmaster-General, Colony of Trinidad and Tobago
George Albert Woodcock, lately Magistrate and First Clerk, Magistracy, Colony of Hong Kong

Indian Civil Service
William Anderson Hasted, Director of Survey, Madras
Maumg Hla Baw (1)  District Judge, Prome and Tharrawaddy, Burma
Charles St. Leger Teyen, Assistant Secretary, Finance Department, United Provinces Secretariat
M. R. Ry. Rao Bahadur Paruvakattil Narayana Menon Avargal, Secretary to the Commissioner of Revenue Settlement, Survey, Land Records and Agriculture, Madras
Henry Bryan Gilmore, Deputy Registrar, High Court of Judicature, Lahore, Punjab
Major William Daniel Neal, Indian Medical Department, Assistant to the Superintendent, Medical College Hospital, Bengal
Joseph Balthazar de Silva, Personal Assistant to the Military Secretary to His Excellency the Governor of Bombay

Imperial Service Medal (ISM)

Hari Charan, Jemadar in the Legislative Department of the Government of India, in recognition of long and meritorious service

References

Birthday Honours
1921 awards
1921 in Australia
1921 in Canada
1921 in India
1921 in New Zealand
1921 in the United Kingdom